Gerarda ("Gerda") Hendrica Maria Lassooij (born 22 August 1952) is a retired Dutch swimmer. She competed at the 1972 Summer Olympics in the 200 m and 400 m individual medley events, but failed to reach the finals.

After marriage she changed her last name to Nolting.

References

1952 births
Living people
Dutch female medley swimmers
Olympic swimmers of the Netherlands
Swimmers at the 1972 Summer Olympics
Swimmers from Amsterdam
20th-century Dutch women